The Suzuka Summer Endurance Race is an annual motorsport event for sports cars that has been held at the Suzuka International Racing Course, Mie Prefecture, Japan since 1966, and the oldest automobile endurance race in Japan. From 1966 to 2017, the event was known as the Suzuka 1000km, a 1000 kilometre race held as part of various championships including Super GT, the All-Japan Endurance/Sports Prototype Championship, the FIA GT Championship, the BPR Global GT Series, and the FIA World Sportscar Championship. From 2018 to 2019, it was the Suzuka 10 Hours for the Intercontinental GT Challenge. Since 2020, the race has not been held due to the COVID-19 pandemic, although a Super GT round has been held at Suzuka during the event's traditional summer time slot.

History

The race, as a 1000 kilometre race, was first held as a standalone event from 1966 to 1973. After a hiatus, the event returned in 1980 for three years before joining the All Japan Sports Prototype Championship, the forerunner to Super GT, in 1983. The event later hosted a round of the 1992 World Sportscar Championship before these series were cancelled. After that the race became part of many different series, including the BPR Global GT Series from 1994 to 1996, the FIA GT Championship from 1997 to 1998, and the Super Taikyu Series as well as returning to being a non-championship event. In 2006, the race was added to the Super GT championship calendar for the first time. Previously, the race was open to JGTC/Super GT cars, but only a handful of competitors from the Super GT championship took part. In 2018, the race moved to the Intercontinental GT Challenge championship, replacing the Sepang 12 Hours held in Malaysia, featuring GT3 and select GT300 class cars from Super GT.

Beverage company Pokka served as the title sponsor of the race from 1994 until 2014. In 2019, Japanese banking company SMBC and collector car auction house BH Auction became the new joint title sponsors of the Suzuka 10 Hours.

The 2020 running of the race, originally scheduled for 22 August, was cancelled as a result of the 2019-20 coronavirus pandemic. The planned running of the race in 2021 was cancelled, also due to the influence of the coronavirus pandemic, and was not scheduled for the 2022 calendar year.

Format
The race was traditionally held over 1000 kilometres from 1966 to 2008. From 2009 to 2011, the race length varied; the 2009 Super GT race was shortened to 700 km due to increasing costs and  emissions regulations, as well as the economic crisis. The 700 km distance was retained in 2010, but as a result of the 2011 Tōhoku earthquake and tsunami and Super GT energy conservation regulations in force that year, the race was cut to 500 km. From 2012, the race returned to being a 1000 kilometre event. In 2018, the race became a 10-hour event as part of its move from Super GT into the Intercontinental GT Challenge, matching the distance of the IMSA WeatherTech SportsCar Championship race Petit Le Mans held in Braselton, Georgia (United States).

In 2018 and 2019, the race offered a prize purse of ¥100 million Yen, with the overall winner receiving a ¥30 million share, the second-place finisher receiving ¥10 million, and the third-place finisher receiving ¥5 million. Prize money is also awarded for the top team in a number of sub-classes including Pro-Am Cup, Silver Cup, and Am Cup. The top teams from Super GT and Super Taikyu also receive a prize bonus, as well as the winner of the Asia Award (given to the top team with no less than two Asian drivers), and the fastest team in both phases of qualifying. In 2019, a "Team of the Day" award was introduced, allowing viewers to vote for their favourite team during the race - who will also receive a prize bonus.

The Suzuka round reverted back to Super GT in 2020, as the IGTC race could not be conducted because of Japanese restrictions. It was held as a 300km race. The same occurred in 2021 with the traditional summer date. In 2022, the Super GT race will now be extended to 450km, returning to the former endurance.

Winners
Among drivers, Kunimitsu Takahashi holds the all-time record with four overall victories at the Suzuka 1000km, winning for the first time in 1973, then taking three more victories during the Group C era of the JSPC in 1984, 1985, and 1989. Five other drivers - Daisuke Ito, Ryo Michigami, Naoki Nagasaka, Sébastien Philippe, and Juichi Wakisaka, have won the event three times overall.

Several past winners of the race have also won the 24 Hours of Le Mans, including Henri Pescarolo, Vern Schuppan, Masanori Sekiya, Stanley Dickens, Yannick Dalmas, Derek Warwick, JJ Lehto, Benoît Tréluyer, Loïc Duval, and Kazuki Nakajima. Past winners including Marcel Tiemann, Bernd Schneider, Frédéric Makowiecki, Maro Engel, Kelvin van der Linde, Dries Vanthoor, and Frédéric Vervisch have also won the Nürburgring 24 Hour race. Other notable former winners include three-time 24 Hours of Daytona winner Bob Wollek, 1989 Japanese Grand Prix winner Alessandro Nannini, 2015 FIA World Endurance Drivers' Champion and Formula One Grand Prix winner Mark Webber, four-time Super GT GT500 Drivers' Champion Ronnie Quintarelli, all-time GT500 class wins leader Tsugio Matsuda, and 2018 and 2020 Japanese "double champion" Naoki Yamamoto.

In recent years, the event has drawn interest from previous Formula One world champion drivers, many of whom had raced at Suzuka Circuit for years during their F1 careers. 2009 champion Jenson Button made his Super GT debut in the 2017 running of the Suzuka 1000km, and in 2019, two-time world champion Mika Häkkinen returned to compete at the Suzuka 10 Hours.

Porsche have more victories in the race than any manufacturer - eleven in total, spanning from 1967 to 1994. The winningest Japanese marques are Honda and Toyota, who have each won the race eight times overall, just ahead of Nissan with seven victories. Toyota's Lexus luxury brand has also won the race five times representing Toyota in the GT500 class of Super GT, from 2006 to 2017.

List of winners

Multiple winners

By driver

By manufacturer

Event names
 1966–93: Suzuka 1000km
 1994–08: International Pokka 1000km
 2009–12: Pokka GT Summer Special
 2013–14: International Pokka Sapporo 1000km
 2015–17: International Suzuka 1000km
 2018: Suzuka 10 Hours
 2019–present: SMBC BH Auction Suzuka 10 Hours

References

External links

Sports car races
Auto races in Japan
Suzuka
Sport in Mie Prefecture